Lissodesmus is a genus of the Dalodesmidae family of Millipedes. It is found in Australia and nearby islands. They are commonly known as Tasmanian Multipedes.

Species
Currently there are 30 accepted species in the genus Lissodesmus according to the World Register of Marine Species (WoRMS). A new species was discovered in 2018 from Tasmania, Australia.

Lissodesmus adrianae Jeekel, 1984
Lissodesmus alisonae Jeekel, 1984
Lissodesmus anas Mesibov, 2006
Lissodesmus bashfordi Mesibov, 2006
Lissodesmus blackwoodensis Mesibov, 2006
Lissodesmus catrionae Mesibov, 2006
Lissodesmus clivulus Mesibov, 2006
Lissodesmus cognatus Mesibov, 2006
Lissodesmus cornutus Mesibov, 2006
Lissodesmus devexus Mesibov, 2006
Lissodesmus dignomontis Mesibov, 2006
Lissodesmus gippslandicus Mesibov, 2006
Lissodesmus grampianensis Mesibov, 2008
Lissodesmus hamatus Mesibov, 2006
Lissodesmus horridomontis Mesibov, 2006
Lissodesmus inopinatus Mesibov, 2006
Lissodesmus johnsi Mesibov, 2006
Lissodesmus latus Mesibov, 2006
Lissodesmus macedonensis Mesibov, 2006
Lissodesmus martini (Carl, 1902)
Lissodesmus milledgei Mesibov, 2006
Lissodesmus modestus Chamberlin, 1920
Lissodesmus montanus Mesibov, 2006
Lissodesmus nivalis Mesibov, 2018
Lissodesmus orarius Mesibov, 2006
Lissodesmus otwayensis Mesibov, 2006
Lissodesmus peninsulensis Mesibov, 2006
Lissodesmus perporosus Jeekel, 1984
Lissodesmus plomleyi Mesibov, 2006
Lissodesmus tarrabulga Mesibov, 2006

Former species
Lissodesmus margaretae Jeekel, 1984 is now accepted as Dasystigma margaretae (Jeekel, 1984).

References

External links

Millipedes of Oceania
Polydesmida